This is a list of songs written by Doc Pomus and Mort Shuman, either together as a  songwriting partnership, with other writers, or individually.

By Doc Pomus and Mort Shuman

By Doc Pomus solo or with other writers

By Mort Shuman with other writers

References

—

Pomus and Shuman